Elsilimomab (also known as B-E8) is a mouse monoclonal antibody. B-E8 was developed by Diaclone, a French company which produces many mouse monoclonal antibodies.

It (OPR-003) targets (and blocks) Interleukin-6.

It has undergone a number of early stage clinical trials, e.g. for lymphoma and myeloma.

It was used as a template to develop a high-affinity, antagonist, fully human anti-IL-6 mAb 1339.

References 

Monoclonal antibodies